John J. O'Connor (June 14, 1855 – January 21, 1898) was an Irish-American politician.

Life 
John was born on June 14, 1855, in Ireland, immigrating to Brooklyn as a child. He came from County Donegal.

After graduating from St James' School, he was employed first as a bookkeeper and later as a wine merchant.

In 1889, John was elected to the New York State Assembly, representing the Kings County 4th District. He served in the Assembly in 1890, 1891, 1892, and 1893.

John was a member of the Catholic Benevolent Legion, the Knights of Columbus, and the Royal Arcanum.

John died on January 21, 1898, in his home on 170 Concord Street. He was buried in Holy Cross Cemetery.

References

External links 

 Political Graveyard

Politicians from County Donegal
American people of Irish descent
1855 births
1898 deaths
Politicians from Brooklyn
Democratic Party members of the New York State Assembly
Catholics from New York (state)
Irish emigrants to the United States (before 1923)
Burials at Holy Cross Cemetery, Brooklyn
19th-century American politicians